Murnpeowie or Murnpeowie Station is a pastoral lease in outback South Australia. The pastoral lease once operated as a sheep station but now operates as a cattle station. The land occupying the extent of the  pastoral lease  was gazetted as a locality by the Government of South Australia on 26 April 2013  with the name "Murnpeowie".

The area is composed of gibber plains that support dense stands Mitchell grass and saltbush.

The unusual name is Aboriginal in origin and means place of the bronzewing pigeon.

Leases in the area were taken up by John Baker in 1857 with more added through the 1860s. Baker was surrounded by leases held by Thomas Elder. When Baker died in 1872, Elder consolidated all of the runs into a single entity of approximately  named Blanchewater Horse Station, with a carrying capacity of 20,000 head. The homestead was constructed in the 1880s, the woolshed in 1890. Both buildings had stone walls and round iron roofs. By 1894 the station was shearing 106,000 sheep, yielding 2,400 bales of wool. In 1909 a total of 120,000 sheep were shorn at Murnpeowie. The Blanchewater Homestead Ruins are listed on both the South Australian Heritage Register and the former Register of the National Estate.
 
Boundary riders at the station discovered a meteorite in 1910. The  stone was thought to be a rock until the men struck it with a hammer and were amazed by the bell-like sound they heard. A small sample was sent to the School of Mines for analysis and once confirmed the meteorite was donated.

In 1920 the property was carrying 90,000 sheep.

The area was struck by drought and then huge dust storms in 1952. The property was purchased in 1998 by David and Nell Brook who have stocked the property with Poll-Hereford cattle.

IBRA biogeographic subregion

See also
List of ranches and stations

References

Stations (Australian agriculture)
Pastoral leases in South Australia
Far North (South Australia)